The Scottish Rite Cathedral is a historic building located at 725 Cotton Street in Shreveport, Louisiana. It was designed in 1915 by architect Edward F. Neild in Beaux Arts style.

The building was listed on the National Register of Historic Places in 1986.

The Cathedral was completed on July 1, 1917.  The grand opening ceremony was held on Monday, November 12, 1917, amid great fanfare and local interest.  As part of the dedication ceremonies, the masons and their wives were treated to two organ recitals, one at 3:30 PM and the other at 8:00 PM.  The guest organist was John Allen Richardson, organist and choirmaster of the St. Paul's Episcopal Church of Chicago, Illinois.  Following the second recital, a dance was held with music provided by the Shriner's El Karubah Band and Orchestra.

Edward F. Neild, a member of the Shreveport Scottish Rite, was the architect of the Scottish Rite Cathedral.  Among Mr. Neild's many other notable achievements were his architectural contributions to the renovation of our nation's capital in Washington D.C, the White House, and the Truman Memorial Library and Museum in Independence, Missouri.  In addition, he is credited with the design of the Shriner's Hospital for Crippled Children, also in Shreveport and the first of its kind in North America.

The building measures 133'1" by 110'5" and the final cost to construct the building in 1917 was $186,477.28.

The Shreveport Scottish Rite Cathedral is one of the most historic and beautiful buildings in the Shreveport area.  It includes a three level auditorium with a seating capacity of five hundred, a wardrobe room, a marble lobby, a pair of matching marble staircases, a kitchen, a banquet hall, a masonic library, numerous offices, a DeMolay room, a basement, and a section where children receive help through a Speech and Language Clinic Charity.

See also
National Register of Historic Places listings in Caddo Parish, Louisiana

References

Beaux-Arts architecture in Louisiana
Masonic buildings completed in 1915
Buildings and structures in Shreveport, Louisiana
Masonic buildings in Louisiana
Clubhouses on the National Register of Historic Places in Louisiana
National Register of Historic Places in Caddo Parish, Louisiana
Individually listed contributing properties to historic districts on the National Register in Louisiana
1915 establishments in Louisiana